.45 Calibre War is a 1929 American silent Western film directed by Leo D. Maloney and starring Don Coleman, Ben Corbett and Jeanette Loff.

Plot 
Reed Lathrop returns to his old home, accompanied by his friend, "Toad" Hunter, to investigate a plot that forces ranchers to sell their properties for very low prices. Finding the ranchers demoralized, he organizes a vigilance committee and enlists the aid of the local circuit judge. Darnell, the owner of the saloon, and Blodgett, a local dealer in ranch property, are unmasked as the culprits. Soon a showdown takes place with the ranchers and the outlaws, ending with the criminals hauled off to prison.

Cast
 Don Coleman as Reed Lathrop 
 Ben Corbett as 'Toad' Hunter 
 Al Hart as Rev. Mr. Simpson 
 Ed Jones as Sheriff Henshaw 
 Duke R. Lee as Nick Darnell 
 Floyd Ames as Jim Walling 
 Jeanette Loff as Ruth Walling 
 Murdock MacQuarrie as Mark Blodgett 
 Orin Jackson as Dr. Sprague

References

External links

 

1929 films
1929 Western (genre) films
1920s English-language films
American black-and-white films
Pathé Exchange films
Films directed by Leo D. Maloney
Silent American Western (genre) films
1920s American films